The South Ukraine Nuclear Power Plant, also known as the Pivdennoukrainsk Nuclear Power Plant, is a nuclear power plant in Ukraine, near the city of Yuzhnoukrainsk in Mykolaiv Oblast, about  south of Kyiv. It is the second largest of the country's five nuclear power stations. It is part of the South Ukrainian Energy Complex, along with the Tashlyk Pumped-Storage Power Plant and Oleksandrivska hydroelectric power station.

It has three VVER-1000 pressurized water reactors and a net generation capacity of 2,850 megawatts (MW). In 2013, following major upgrade work, unit 1 was given a 10-year license extension, which will take it beyond its original 30-year design lifetime. Similar extensions are planned for units 2 and 3, licensed until 2015 and 2019, respectively.

The  Vetrino–Isaccea–Yuzhnoukrainsk powerline runs from the plant to Isaccea, Romania, but is mostly dismantled or ruined.

According to Ukraine, Russian troops were advancing to the plant in the 2022 Russian invasion of Ukraine, but were repelled in the March 2022 Battle of Voznesensk.

On 19 September 2022, the power plant was reportedly hit by Russian artillery. A missile exploded about 300 metres from the reactors, blowing out windows in the buildings and damaging a neighbouring hydroelectric power station. Nuclear reactors were not damaged.

Fuel supply
The main supplier of fuel for nuclear power plants in Ukraine has been TVEL, with whom NNEGC signed a contract for the supply of nuclear fuel for Ukrainian WMR in 1997 until 2010.

Under a US-Ukrainian initiative to reduce Ukraine's dependency on Russia for fuel, tied to the dismantling of its nuclear weapon arsenal, Energoatom had been using reactor core of unit 3 to test nuclear fuel produced by Westinghouse Electric Company in Västerås in Sweden, mixed with Russian assemblies. In August 2005, it was loaded with the first six experimental fuel assemblies produced by Westinghouse together with Russian fuel for a period of pilot operation. The pilot runs were "deemed unsuccessful, with Energoatom claiming manufacturing defects in the fuel led to a lengthy unscheduled outage at two of the units, while Westinghouse said that errors had been made during fuel loading". Nevertheless, in 2008, Energoatom signed a fuel supply contract with Westinghouse to supply 630 nuclear fuel assemblies to its three reactors starting in 2011. Westinghouse shipped a reload batch of 42 fuel assemblies for the 3 units in mid-2009 to last for three years of commercial operation.
In June 2010, Energoatom signed a long-term fuel supply contract with Russia's TVEL for its nuclear reactor fleet. Earlier, Rosatom had offered a substantial discount to Ukraine if it signed up with TVEL for 20 years.

During trial use of Westinghouse manufactured fuel in 2012, the fuel became deformed and caused serious damage to the reactor.

On 11 April 2014, after the Russian annexation of Crimea, the fuel contract with Westinghouse was extended through 2020. The fuel will be made at the fuel fabrication facility in Västerås.

See also

 Nuclear power in Ukraine
 List of power stations in Ukraine
 Power generation in Ukraine

References

External links

 Archived official website in English.
 Profile on Nuclear Safety site

1983 establishments in Ukraine
Buildings and structures in Mykolaiv Oblast
Energoatom
Energy infrastructure completed in 1983
Energy infrastructure completed in 1985
Energy infrastructure completed in 1989
Nuclear power stations built in the Soviet Union
Nuclear power stations in Ukraine
Nuclear power stations using VVER reactors